Kumar Suresh Singh (1935–2006) commonly known as K. S. Singh, was an Indian Administrative Service officer, who served as a Commissioner of Chotanagpur (1978–80) and Director-General of the Anthropological Survey of India. He is known principally for his oversight and editorship of the People of India survey and for his studies of tribal history.

Life
Kumar Suresh Singh came from a privileged background, growing up in Munger, Bihar. He studied history, gaining a first-class BA from Patna University. He subsequently obtained a master's degree, and finally a PhD on the subject of the revolutionary, Birsa Munda.

He joined the Indian Administrative Service (IAS) in 1958. He worked among the Mundals and then spent the period 1965–1968 as Deputy Commissioner at Palamu, in the Chhotanagpur area. This posting coincided with the Bihar famine, for which he helped to organise relief and which introduced some innovative approaches that have subsequently been adopted elsewhere.

His posts in the government of Bihar included being Secretary in various departments: Industries (1973–1974), Rural Development (1974–1975, and 1980–1981), and Forest and Environment (1982–1984). A. K. Sinha has noted that "Because of his honesty, integrity and adherence to the norms of administration, he was not allowed to complete his term in any department in Bihar."

In between these various government posts, Singh returned to Chhotanagpur as Commissioner for the period 1978–1980. In 1984 he was appointed Director-General of the Anthropological Survey of India (ASI) and also Director of the Indira Gandhi Rashtriya Manav Sangrahalaya (National Museum of Mankind) in Bhopal.

Although Singh retired from the ASI in 1993, he remained General Editor of the People of India series until his death on 20 May 2006. He completed the final volume just before dying, having previously suffering partial paralysis from a stroke. He was a National Fellow of the Indian Council of Historical Research at the time of his death. Muchkund Dubey subsequently commented that

Tribal studies
Singh wrote a PhD thesis on Birsa Munda, the leader of an insurgency campaign against British rule. To do this he had to rely significantly on folk-lore and other forms of oral history practised by the tribal inhabitants of the Jharkhand area of Bihar, where in total he spent 15 years conducting fieldwork. Although Singh considered Damodar Dharmananda Kosambi to be the first mainstream subaltern historian, Sinha notes that Singh himself may have been. He went on to produce other works on tribal history.

People of India
Singh had responsibility for the organisation, compilation and oversight of the People of India survey, which was intended to be an anthropological study of the differences and linkages between all of the communities in India.The survey involved 470 scholars and identified 4694 communities during its period of fieldwork between October 1985 and 1994. Sinha notes a total of 3000 scholars, which figure appears to include those involved at various seminars and workshops. The full results of the survey fill 43 published volumes, of which 12 had been produced at the time of Singh's death.

The purpose and methodology of the survey has received criticism. Laura Dudley Jenkins, for example, has said that 

A review of the first volume of the series over Contributions to Indian Sociology, noted:-

Another opinion favourably contrasts the project with colonial ethnography, with Sinha saying that 

Another informed opinion states that, ‘The People of India study conducted by K.S.Singh was entirely swadeshi. This presented a major breakthrough not only in terms of conceptual framework but also in methodology. The POI project sought to assemble people’s knowledge pertaining to culture and environment, and explore the idioms, the structures, and the cognitive processes reflected in the understanding and perception of people about themselves, and their relationship to one another and with the environment’.

It further states that, ‘It is this home-grown approach to visualize Indian society in terms of native paradigms which made the PoI project an essentially Swadeshi Mission, designed in terms of indigenous prerequisites and ethos of people. It was meant to situate the people in diverse culture zones which were not bounded but porous. The ‘People of India’ study has indeed proved to be a milestone in post-colonial ethnography, with emphasis on Indian ideal of cultural pluralism’.

Publications
Aside from his writing, as author and as editor, in volumes related to the People of India survey, Singh also wrote and edited other works, a selection of which are:

 – published version of Singh's PhD dissertation

See also
William Crooke
Herbert Hope Risley

References

Further reading
 
 
 Das, N. K. (2021). K.S. Singh: Anthropologist and Tribal Historian. In Architects of Anthropology in India Vol. 1 Edited by Sarthak Sengupta. pp. 225–240. New Delhi: Gyan Publishing House

External links
Anthropological Survey of India

1935 births
2006 deaths
Indian anthropologists
Indian civil servants
Patna University alumni
20th-century Indian biographers
Indian social sciences writers
People from Munger district
Scholars from Bihar
Scientists from Patna
20th-century anthropologists